Osgoode Township is a former township that is now a part of the city of Ottawa, Ontario, Canada.  The township along the Rideau River was established in 1798 and incorporated in 1850. It was an independent township in Carleton County until its amalgamation with the city in 2001. It remains a largely rural area with only some 23,285 inhabitants as of the 2016 census. As of the Canada 2021 Census, this had increased to 24,199. On Ottawa city council it is represented by George Darouze.

Several branches of the Castor River, a tributary of the South Nation River, flow through the township.

The township took its name from William Osgoode, the first Chief Justice of Upper Canada.

History 
Originally the territory of the Mississaugas, the land for the township was acquired by the British in the 1780s. But not until 1827 did the first European settlers, the McDonnell and York families, arrive. The early settlers were attracted to the area by the good farm land and the large stands of white pine and white oak. The first two township roads intersected in Baker's Corners (now Metcalfe). Further settlement in the township followed the construction of the Rideau Canal and the railway through Osgoode.

Osgoode Township was incorporated in 1850. It was merged into the City of Ottawa on January 1, 2001.

Reeves
 1850 - Arthur Allen
 1855 - John Dow
 1857 - John C. Bower
 1858 - John Dow
 1871 - Alexander McEwen
 1873 - Ira Morgan
 1876 - Adam J. Baker
 1879 - Ira Morgan
 1883 - W.F. Campbell
 1884 - Ira Morgan
 1892 - James Whiteside
 1893 - Allan P. McDonell
 1900 - James Simpson
 1904 - Thomas James
 1907 - Alex Dow
 1918 - Duncan McDiarmid
 1922 - S.J. Loney
 1926 - J.H. Nixon
 1934 - George S. Lewis
 1948 - Dr. W. A. Taylor
 1950 - John E. Boland
 1958 - Dr. W. A. Taylor
 1976 - Al Bouwers

Mayors 
 1982 - 1995 - Al Bouwers
 1995 - 1998 - Lloyd Cranston
 1998 - 2001 - Doug Thompson

Demographics

According to the Canada 2011 Census:
Population: 22,239
% Change (2006-2011): +9.4%
Dwellings:  
Area (km²): 379.86
Density (persons per km²): 58.5

See also
Castor Valley Elementary School
Greely Elementary School
Greely, Ontario
Kenmore, Ontario
Metcalfe, Ontario
Osgoode Township High School
Osgoode, Ontario
Vernon, Ontario
List of townships in Ontario

References

External links
Osgoode Township Historical Society

Former township municipalities in Ontario
Former municipalities now in Ottawa
Populated places disestablished in 2000